Wake Up was an Australian breakfast television program produced by Network Ten. The show was hosted by Natarsha Belling and James Mathison. It aired weekday mornings from 6.30am to 8.30am, before Ten's morning talk show Studio 10. Wake Up, launched on 4 November 2013, was presented from Queenscliff Surf Club at Manly Beach in Sydney, with Nuala Hafner presenting national news updates from a glass studio at Federation Square in Melbourne. Due to poor ratings, the show was cancelled just six months after its debut, with the last episode airing 23 May 2014.

Presenters

Reporters and contributors

Natasha Exelby was originally a co-host alongside Belling and Mathison, but was dropped from the show less than three weeks after its launch due to a lack of chemistry. Creator Adam Boland stated that he saw "genuine spark during show rehearsals" but that it did not translate on air.

Controversy
On 14 May 2014, the morning after the announcement of the 2014 Australian federal budget, Wake Up invited Prime Minister Tony Abbott to take part in an on-air forum involving members of the public. One of the participants, 85-year-old Brisbane pensioner Vilma Ward, began to ambush Abbott live on air, telling him "I've never heard such rubbish in all my life" referring to his plan to raise the pension age. Ward also called Abbott a "comedian". It later emerged that Ward had strong links with the Australian Labor Party dating back to the 1960s and had appeared in an election campaign brochure. Network Ten admitted they were not aware of Ward's links prior to the segment.

Reception
Following its first show, Wake Up was considered in some quarters as a vast improvement over its predecessor, Breakfast.

Wake Up's first episode averaged 52,000 viewers nationally. A week after the first episode, the show had lost around half of its audience share, even rating lower than Breakfast (Wake Up's predecessor, which had been cancelled the year before due to low ratings).

References

2013 Australian television series debuts
2014 Australian television series endings
Australian television news shows
Breakfast television in Australia
English-language television shows
Network 10 original programming
Television shows set in Sydney
10 News First